Metanephrops japonicus is a species of lobster found in Japanese waters, and a gourmet food in Japanese cuisine.

References

True lobsters
Crustaceans described in 1873